Bruchus brachialis, the vetch bruchid, is a species of leaf beetle in the family Chrysomelidae. It is found in Europe & Northern Asia (excluding China) and North America.

References

Further reading

External links

 

Bruchinae
Articles created by Qbugbot
Beetles described in 1839